Mary + Jane is an American comedy television series that aired on MTV from September 5 to November 14, 2016. The show stars Scout Durwood and Jessica Rothe, and is produced by rapper Snoop Dogg, Deborah Kaplan, and Harry Elfont.

On February 9, 2017, MTV cancelled the show after one season.

Plot
The series follows Paige and Jordan, two young entrepreneurs selling marijuana through a weed-delivery service in Los Angeles.

Cast and characters

Main
 Scout Durwood as Jordan
 Jessica Rothe as Paige

Recurring
 Kosha Patel as Jenee
 Dan Ahdoot as Robbie
 H. Michael Croner as Chris

Guest
 Andy Daly
 Snoop Dogg
 Seth Green
 Missi Pyle
 Leonard Roberts

Episodes

References

External links

 

2010s American comedy television series
2016 American television series debuts
2016 American television series endings
American television series about cannabis
MTV original programming
Snoop Dogg
Television shows set in Los Angeles